Temanggung Regency is a regency in the Central Java Province of Indonesia. It covers a land area of 870.65 km2 and had a population of 708,546 at the 2010 Census and 790,174 at the 2020 Census. Its capital is the town of Temanggung.

All travellers going to the Dieng temple complex from Yogya or Semarang have to pass through this regency.

Temanggung Regency is famous for longan, a small sweet fruit that is harvested in January and February.

Geography

Temanggung Regency is located on the volcanic Dieng Plateau with an average elevation between 500 and 1450 meters. It is landlocked. The volcanoes Mount Sundoro and Mount Sumbing rise on its border with the Wonosobo Regency. Its major drainage system is the Progo River and its tributaries.

Borders
It is bordered by:
 Pekalongan Regency to the northeast
 Batang Regency to the north
 Semarang Regency to the east
 Magelang Regency to the south
 Wonosobo Regency to the southwest

Administrative districts
Temanggung Regency is divided into the following twenty districts (kecamatan), listed below with their areas and their populations at the 2010 Census and the 2020 Census. The table also includes the number of administrative villages (rural desa and urban kelurahan) in each district.

All districts bear the same name as their administrative centres, except Parakan District (of which the centre is Parakan Wetan) and Temanggung District (of which the centre is Jampirejo).

Communities
The major towns of Temanggung Regency, aside from the capital of Temanggung, include Candiroto, Jumo, Kaloran, Kandangan, Kranggan, Muntung, Ngadirejo, Parakan, and Tretep.

Climate
Temanggung has an elevation moderated tropical rainforest climate (Af) with moderate rainfall from June to September and heavy to very heavy rainfall from October to May. The following climate data is for the town of Temanggung.

History
After World War II, Temanggung Regency was one of the areas in central Java where the Communist Party (PKI) had its rural strongholds. In the 21st century Temanggung Regency provided a hideout for members of the Islamist Jemaah Islamiyah.

Religion

The majority of the population of the Temanggung Regency is Muslim. It was once predominantly Hindu for thousands of years. The oldest stone structure in Indonesia is found here; four temples of Shiva, and one of the trinity of Hinduism. Though there were 400, only four remain.

Economy
The big cash crop in the Temanggung Regency is tobacco. Other cash crops include patchouli oil, honey and soy oil.  The traditional herbal medicine, jamu, is the basis of a local industry, as is the production of cigars.  Silkworms are raised in the area around the town of Candiroto.

Transportation
There is a rail line from Parakan through the town of Temanggung south to Magelang and on to junction with the coastal rail lines; however, it is currently closed by the government due to the operational costs.

Culture and tourism 

 Gondosuli Temple – A newly discovered temple located 13 km from the town of Temanggung.
 Kledung – a scenic pass between Mount Sumbing (3371 M) and Mount Sundoro (3133 M), it is crossed at around 2340 M. Located 20 km from Temanggung, it is a site for relaxing and mountaineering.
 Jumprit – a pool on the slope of Mount Sundoro, located 22 km from Temanggung. The water is cool and clean, and to some meditators considered as a holy place.
 Pringapus Temple- located near Jumprit. It was built by Sanjaya kingdom.
 Pakitan and Parakan – two small towns in the regency. Pakitan is situated between the hills, and has a cool climate.
 Meteorit – located in Wonotirto subdistrict Bulu
 Mbelang Sari Hills – a hill which borders on three different areas, located in Mblawong
 Water Fall Trocoh / Curug Trocoh – Located in Wonoboyo

Notes

External links

 "Temanggung Google Satellite Map" Maplandia World Gazetteer

Regencies of Central Java